Jeremy Allen Moss (born June 23, 1986) is an American politician from Michigan currently representing the 7th State Senate District, which includes Farmington, Farmington Hills, Ferndale, Hazel Park, Huntington Woods, Lathrup Village, Madison Heights, Oak Park, Pleasant Ridge, Royal Oak Township, and Southfield. A member of the Democratic Party, he is the first openly LGBT person to serve as president pro tempore of the Michigan Senate as well as the first openly gay man and second openly LGBT person to serve in a statewide office in Michigan (after Dana Nessel). Moss previously served in the Michigan House of Representatives from 2014 - 2018, and remains the youngest-ever member of the Southfield City Council.

Personal life
Moss was born on June 23, 1986 in Detroit and is a lifelong resident of Southfield, Michigan. He attended Hillel Day School and graduated from Wylie E. Groves High School in the Birmingham Public School District.

He graduated with high honors from Michigan State University with a bachelor's degree in journalism and an additional major in political science. While attending Michigan State, he studied race relations in South Africa and graduated from the Michigan Political Leadership Program Fellowship. He was also president of the university's Phi Sigma Pi.

Moss is currently a member organizations such as the Greater Southfield/Farmington chapter of the National Association for the Advancement of Colored People and the Martin Luther King Task Force, and is a board member of Congregation Beth Ahm in Oakland County.

He also serves on the Michigan Democratic Party's State Central Committee, as a board member of the Southfield Lathrup Village Democratic Club, and has been a Southfield Democratic Precinct Delegate. He was an alternate delegate from Michigan to the 2012 Democratic National Convention. In 2011, he was selected Young Democrat of the Year by the Oakland County Democratic Party.

Moss is openly gay and Jewish.

Professional life
Moss worked in the offices of Mayor Brenda Lawrence and State Representative Paul Condino. He worked as District Director for State Representative Rudy Hobbs after serving as his campaign manager.

In November 2011, at age 25, he placed first among eight candidates to be elected to serve as the youngest-ever member of the Southfield City Council. He served as chairman of the council's Legislative and Urban Affairs Committee, and as a member of the Boards and Commission and Neighborhood Services committees. In 2013, Moss successfully advocated for the creation of a new Economic Development Committee.

He was elected to serve the 35th District in the Michigan House of Representatives in November 2014. He became the second openly gay member elected to the Michigan legislature.

In his first term in the Michigan House of Representatives, he served as minority vice chairman of the House Local Government Committee and sat on the House Commerce and Trade and House Regulatory Reform committees.

Moss was re-elected in 2016. He was selected by his colleagues to serve as the House Democratic Whip. In his second term, he served as minority vice chairman of the House Regulatory Reform Committee and sat on the House Elections and Ethics Committee, House Local Government Committee, and the Joint Committee on Administrative Rules.

Electoral history
Moss was elected to the Southfield City Council in 2011, placing first in a crowded field of candidates to earn a four-year term. In 2014, he defeated Nicole Brown, Darryle Buchanan and Charles Roddis in the Democratic primary for the 35th District of the Michigan House of Representatives on August 5, 2014. He then went on to defeat Republican Party candidate Robert Brim in the general election on November 4, 2014. He defeated Brim in a rematch in 2016.

In 2018, Moss defeated Crystal Bailey, Vanessa Moss, and James Turner in the Democratic primary for the 11th State Senate district. He went on to defeat Republican Boris Tuman and Libertarian James Young in the general election.

See also

 Michigan House of Representatives

References

External links
 
 Official Senate Profile
 Michigan House's Democratic Caucus Website for Representative Moss

1986 births
21st-century American Jews
21st-century American politicians
American LGBT city council members
Democratic Party members of the Michigan House of Representatives
Gay politicians
Jewish American people in Michigan politics
Jewish American state legislators in Michigan
LGBT Jews
LGBT state legislators in Michigan
Living people
Michigan State University alumni
People from Southfield, Michigan
Politicians from Detroit